Sunrisers are a women's cricket team that represent the London and East region, one of eight regional hubs in English domestic women's cricket. They play their home matches at various grounds, including the County Cricket Ground, Chelmsford. They are captained by Kelly Castle and coached by Andy Tennant. The team is partnered with Middlesex, Essex, Northamptonshire, Hertfordshire, Cambridgeshire, Suffolk, Norfolk, Bedfordshire and Huntingdonshire, as well as Marylebone Cricket Club.

History
In 2020, women's cricket in England was restructured, creating eight new 'regional hub' teams, with the intention of playing both 50-over and 20-over cricket. Sunrisers were one of the sides created under this structure, representing the London and East region, Middlesex, Essex, Northamptonshire, Hertfordshire, Cambridgeshire, Suffolk, Norfolk, Bedfordshire and Huntingdonshire, as well as Marylebone Cricket Club. The side was to be captained by Amara Carr and coached by Trevor Griffin. Due to the COVID-19 pandemic, the 2020 season was truncated, and only 50-over cricket was played, in the Rachael Heyhoe Flint Trophy. Sunrisers finished bottom of the South Group in the competition, losing all six of their matches. At the end of the season, five Sunrisers players were given full-time domestic contracts, the first of their kind in England: Amara Carr, Naomi Dattani, Cordelia Griffith, Jo Gardner and Kelly Castle.

The following season, 2021, Sunrisers competed in both the Rachael Heyhoe Flint Trophy and the newly-formed Twenty20 competition, the Charlotte Edwards Cup. The side again lost all of their matches in the Rachael Heyhoe Flint Trophy, finishing bottom of the eight-team group. For the Charlotte Edwards Cup, Kelly Castle was named as captain of the side. In the first match of the tournament, Sunrisers recorded their first ever victory, beating Western Storm by 7 wickets. However, they did not win another match in the tournament and finished bottom of their group, although they did tie their home match against North West Thunder.

Ahead of the 2022 season, it was announced that Castle was becoming captain of the side in all formats, and that Trevor Griffin was stepping down as Head Coach for personal reasons. Griffin was later replaced by Laura Marsh, taking on the Head Coach role on an interim basis for the 2022 season. The side finished bottom of their Charlotte Edwards Cup group, losing all six of their matches. The side also finished bottom of the Rachael Heyhoe Flint Trophy group, losing all of their completed matches. Sunrisers all-rounder Grace Scrivens was the joint-leading wicket-taker in the competition, with 13 wickets, and the third-highest run-scorer, with 297 runs. At the end of the season, it was announced that Andy Tennant had been appointed as the permanent Head Coach of the side.

Home grounds

Players

Current squad
As per 2022 season.
 No. denotes the player's squad number, as worn on the back of their shirt.
  denotes players with international caps.

Academy
The Sunrisers Academy team plays against other regional academies in friendly and festival matches across various formats. The Academy selects players from across the Sunrisers regional hub, and includes some players who are also in the first team squad. Players in the 2022/23 Academy are listed below:

Coaching staff

 Head Coach: Andy Tennant
 Regional Director: Danni Warren
 Spin Bowling Coach: Mark Lane
 Talent Manager/Seam Bowling Coach: Luke Pomfret
 Sports Doctor: Phil Batty
 Head Strength & Conditioning Coach: Tom Brazier
 Performance Analyst: Kieran Phillips
 Psycho-Social Lead: Kate Green

As of the 2022 season.

Seasons

Rachael Heyhoe Flint Trophy

Charlotte Edwards Cup

Statistics

Rachael Heyhoe Flint Trophy

 Abandoned matches are counted as NR (no result)
 Win or loss by super over or boundary count are counted as tied.

Charlotte Edwards Cup

 Abandoned matches are counted as NR (no result)
 Win or loss by super over or boundary count are counted as tied.

Records

Rachael Heyhoe Flint Trophy
Highest team total: 308/6, v Southern Vipers on 12 September 2021.
Lowest (completed) team total: 53 v Northern Diamonds on 5 June 2021.
Highest individual score: 99, Amara Carr v South East Stars on 31 August 2020.
Best individual bowling analysis: 4/20, Grace Scrivens v Northern Diamonds on 9 July 2022.
Most runs: 595 runs in 19 matches, Grace Scrivens.
Most wickets: 20 wickets in 19 matches, Grace Scrivens.

Charlotte Edwards Cup
Highest team total: 160/5, v Western Storm on 18 May 2022.
Lowest (completed) team total: 101/7 v Northern Diamonds on 25 August 2021.
Highest individual score: 63, Cordelia Griffith v North West Thunder on 28 August 2021.
Best individual bowling analysis: 4/33, Grace Scrivens v Western Storm on 18 May 2022.
Most runs: 233 runs in 12 matches, Grace Scrivens.
Most wickets: 12 wickets in 12 matches, Grace Scrivens.

See also
 Bedfordshire Women cricket team
 Cambridgeshire Women cricket team
 Essex Women cricket team
 Hertfordshire Women cricket team
 Huntingdonshire Women cricket team
 Middlesex Women cricket team
 Norfolk Women cricket team
 Northamptonshire Women cricket team
 Suffolk Women cricket team

References

 
2020 establishments in England
Cricket in Essex
Essex County Cricket Club
Middlesex County Cricket Club
Northamptonshire County Cricket Club
Cricket clubs established in 2020
English Domestic Women's Cricket Regional Hub teams